The Benjamin Coker House is a historic First Period house in Newburyport, Massachusetts.  The oldest portion of the house, the central chimney and the rooms to its left, were built c. 1700 on a site at the corner of High and Federal Streets.  The building was widened in the mid 18th century, adding the rooms to the right.  The building was moved to its present location in 1856, and enlarged with a two-story addition on the rear.  It underwent a major rehabilitation in 1989, but retains some mid 18th century decorative details.

The house was listed on the National Register of Historic Places in 1990, after it had been included in the Newburyport Historic District in 1984.

See also
National Register of Historic Places listings in Essex County, Massachusetts

References

Houses in Newburyport, Massachusetts
Houses on the National Register of Historic Places in Essex County, Massachusetts
Historic district contributing properties in Massachusetts